Bagheri Expressway is an expressway in eastern Tehran in Tehranpars neighborhood. It connects East to Northeast.

Expressways in Tehran